Kabaddi, is a contact sport, native to the Indian subcontinent. It is one of the most popular sports in India, played mainly among people in villages. India has taken part in four Asian Games in kabaddi, and won gold in all of them. Four forms of kabaddi played in India are Amar, Suranjeevi, huttuttoo, and Gaminee. Amar is generally played in Punjab, Haryana, the United States, Canada, and other parts of the world, mostly by Punjabi sportsmen. Suranjeevi is the most played form of kabaddi in India and the world. This is the form used in international matches generally and played in Asian Games. Huttuttoo was played by men in Maharashtra. 
In Gaminee style, seven players play on each side and a player put out has to remain out until all his team members are out. The team that is successful in outing all the players of the opponent's side secures a point. The game continues until five or seven such points are secured and has no fixed time duration.

History and development
 

Kabaddi is a sport developed centered on Jallikattu. It is common among the Ayar tribal people who lived in the Mullai geographical region of ancient Tamil Nadu. A player going to the opposition is treated like a Bull. It is like taming a bull without touching it, as it is mentioned in Sangam Literature that the game Sadugudu was practiced for ages. There are also accounts of Gautam Buddha having played the game recreationally. There is another version to this sports origins and rich history, Legend has it that kabaddi originated in Tamil Nadu over 4,000 years ago.

The game was said to have been popular among the Yadava people. An Abhang by Tukaram stated that the lord Krishna  played the game in his youth.

Modern kabaddi is a synthesis of the game played in various forms under different names. Kabaddi received international exposure during the 1936 Berlin Olympics. The game was introduced in the Indian Olympic Games at Calcutta in 1938.

In 1950 the All India Kabaddi Federation came into existence and compiled standard rules. The Amateur Kabaddi Federation of India (AKFI) was founded in 1973. After formation of the Amateur Kabaddi Federation of India, the first men's nationals were held in Tamil Nadu (Madras) (renamed Chennai), while the women's were in AKFI has given new shape to the rules.

The Asian Kabaddi Federation (AKF) was founded under the chairmanship of kabaddi.

In 1979, a return test between Bangladesh and India was held at different places of India including Mumbai, Hyderabad, and Punjab. The Asian Kabaddi Championship was arranged in 1980 and India emerged as champion and Bangladesh runner-up. Bangladesh became runner-up again in 1985 in the Asian Kabaddi Championship held in Jaipur, India. The other teams in the tournament were Nepal, Malaysia and Japan. The game was included for the first time in the Asian Games in Beijing in 1990. India, China, Japan, Malaysia, Sri Lanka, Pakistan, and Bangladesh took part. India won the gold medal and has also won gold at the following six Asian Games in Hiroshima in 1994, Bangkok in 1998, Busan in 2002, Doha in 2006 and Guangzhou in 2010.

An attempt to popularise kabaddi in Great Britain was carried out by Channel 4, who commissioned a programme dedicated to the sport. The programme, kabaddi in the early 1990s, however, failed to capture viewer attention despite fixtures such as West Bengal Police versus the Punjab. Kabaddi was axed in 1992. Alt-rock band The Cooper Temple Clause formed a kabbadi team in 2001 and were, at one stage, ranked seventh in the British domestic standings.[10] [better source needed]

In the 1998 Asian games held at Bangkok (Thailand), the Indian kabaddi team clinched the gold medal. The chief coach of the team was former kabaddi player and coach Flt. Lt. S P Singh.

In a major upset, seven-time gold medalist India suffered their first-ever loss in 28 years at the 2018 Asian Games to South Korea in the men's Kabaddi group A game. In the semi-final, Iran sent the seven-time Asiad champions packing with a 27–18 win. India, who took home the bronze for reaching the semi-finals, did not play in the final since the introduction of the Games in the Asiad in 1990 at Beijing.

Variation

Standard style
Each has three supplementary players held in reserve. The game is played with 20-minute halves, with a 5-minute halftime break during which the teams exchange sides. During each raid, a player from the attacking side—known as the "raider"—runs into the opposing team's side of the field and attempts to tag as many of the seven defending players as possible. For a raid to be eligible for points, the raider must cross the baulk line in the defending team's territory, and return to their half of the field without being tackled. Whilst doing so, the raider must also chant the word "kabaddi", confirming to referees that their raid is done on a single rhythm. A 30-second shot clock is also enforced on each raid.

A point is scored for each defender tagged, and a point can also be scored if the raider can step into the area past the territory's bonus line. If the raider is successfully stopped, the opposing team earns a point instead. All players tagged are taken out of the game, but one is "revived" for each point a team scores from a subsequent tag or tackle (bonus points do not revive players). Players who step out of bounds are also out. A raid where no points are scored by the raider is referred to as an "empty raid". By contrast, a play where the raider scores three or more points is referred to as a "super raid". If a team gets all seven players on the opposing team out at once, an "All Out" is scored for two bonus points, and they are automatically revived.

Additional rules are used in the Pro Kabaddi League; if a team has two empty raids in a row, the next raider must score a point on his/her raid or else he/she  will be out ("do-or-die raid"). Additionally, when a defending team has less than four players left on the field, tackles are worth 2 points ("super tackle").

Circle style

Four major forms of kabaddi played in India which are recognised by the amateur federation. In Sanjeevani kabaddi, one player is revived against one player of the opposite team who is out – one out. The game is played over 40 min with a 5 min break between halves. There are seven players on each side and the team that outs all the players on the opponent's side scores four extra points. In Gaminee style, seven players play on either side and a player put out has to remain out until all his team members are out. The team that is successful in ousting all the players of the opponent's side secures a point. The game continues until five or seven such points are secured and has no fixed time duration. Amar style resembles the Sanjeevani form in the time frame rule. But, a player who is declared out doesn't leave the court, but instead stays inside, and the play goes along. For every player of the opposition touched “out”, a team earns a point.

International competitions
Note that all of the following competitions are played in standard style.

Kabaddi World Cup

The second Kabaddi World Cup tournament was held in 2007 with India winning over Iran in the final round. The Punjab government organised a Circle Style 2010 Kabaddi World Cup from 3 to 12 April 2010. On 12 April 2010 Indian team emerged as the winner after beating Pakistan in the finals. The opening match of the tournament was held in Patiala while the closing ceremony took place in Ludhiana. India won the first edition of the Circle Style Kabaddi World Cup, beating rival Pakistan in a 58–24 victory. The final of this 10-day tournament was played at Guru Nanak Stadium.

Pro kabaddi league

Pro kabaddi league was introduced in 2014 in India based on Indian premier league. The first edition of the tournament had begun at 26 July 2014 with eight franchises based at eight different cities in India consisting of players from all over the world. The Jaipur Pink Panthers is owned by Bollywood star Abhishek Bachchan who said he wants to promote kabaddi. The other teams are the U Mumba based at Mumbai, the Bengaluru Bulls, the Delhi Dabbangs, the Puneri Paltans, the Telugu Titans based at Vizag, the Bengal Warriors based at Kolkata and the Patna Pirates based at Patna, Bihar. Among all seasons, Patna Pirates is the most successful team with three times title winner while U Mumba and Jaipur Pink Panthers shares 1-1 title.

The organisers have added four new teams in the PKL season 5, 2017: the Haryana Steelers, the Tamil Thalaivas from Tamil Nadu, the Gujarat Giants, and the UP Yoddha.

The opening match was held at Mumbai where Amitabh Bachchan was found cheering for his son's team. Aishwarya Rai was also present with Abhishek Bachchan. Together with them Bollywood stars Shahrukh Khan, Aamir Khan, Sunil Shetty, Sonali Bendre, Farah Khan, Boman Irani and producer Ronnie Screwvala cheering for his team Jaipur Pink Panthers were present at the stadium.

Indian star cricketer Sachin Tendulkar was present with his wife and daughter who said he enjoyed the speed, agility, and strength of the players of the sport very much.

Rakesh Kumar the captain of the Indian kabaddi team who has received an Arjuna Award and also the captain of Patna Pirates was also present at the inaugural matches who said it is a pleasure to see kabaddi getting recognition through the tournament.

Rakesh Kumar was the highest bought player in the auction by Patna pirates for 12.80 lakhs held before the tournament.

The broadcast rights were won by the Star Sports network.

Domestic Competitions
Kabaddi nationals

The Kabaddi Senior Nationals is the pre-eminent tournament conducted by AKFI to promote the sport of kabaddi within India. In 2019 the 66th Edition of the tournament is being conducted in Roha, Raigad, with 31 teams competing.

Federation Cup
Telangana Premier Kabaddi League

Performance By India national team in International competitions

Men's team

India national kabaddi team represents India in international kabaddi and India national kabaddi team competitions. India won gold medals at Asian Games in 1990, 1994, 1998, 2002, 2006, 2010, and 2014. The 2018 edition is Indian Team's not winning the gold medal first time.

World Cup (Standard Style)
India has won three Kabaddi world cups till now. All the world cups were held in India.

World Cup (Circle Style)
India has won six Kabaddi world cups out of seven played till now.

Asian Games

Asian Indoor games

South Asian Games
India is very strong in Kabaddi as these results show. India won 10 gold medals out of a possible 11 until the 2019 South Asian Games.

Women's team

India women's national kabaddi team represents India in international women's kabaddi events.

World Cup

Asian Games

Federation

India
The Kabaddi Federation of India (KFI) was founded in 1950, and it compiled a standard set of rules. The Amateur Kabaddi Federation of India (AKFI) was founded in 1973. The AKFI has given new shape to the rules and it has also the rights of modification in the rules. The Asian Kabaddi Federation was founded under the chairmanship of Sharad Pawar.

The Governing body of Kabaddi in Asia is the Asian Kabaddi Federation (AKF) headed by Mr. Janardan Singh Gehlot. AKF is affiliated to the Olympic Council of Asia.

The parent body to regulate the game at the international level is the International Kabaddi Federation (IKF). India won the world cup in December 2013 by defeating Pakistan in finals at Punjab. In 2016 India had won world cup finals by defeating Iran.

Films about kabaddi
 Okkadu (2003)
 Kabaddi Kabaddi (2003)
 Ghilli (2004)
 Vennila Kabadi Kuzhu (2009)
 Bheemli Kabadi Jattu (2010)
 Kennedy Club  (2019)
 Panga (2020)
 Seetimaarr (2021)
Pop culture references
In the 1993 movie Little Buddha in which Keanu Reeves plays the Siddhartha Gautama, a game of kabbadi is depicted.

See also
 India national kabaddi team
 India women's national kabaddi team
 Pro Kabaddi League
 Women's Kabaddi Challenge
 Kabaddi at the Asian Games
 World Kabaddi League
 Punjabi Kabaddi
 Kho kho
 Tag

References